Arkadi Alexandrovich Suvorov (15 (27) August 1784 - 13 April 1811), Count Rymniksky, was a Russian general. A son of Alexander Suvorov, he rose to the rank of lieutenant general.

Life
He fought in the Italian and Swiss expedition (1799–1800). After his father's death Arkadi married Elena Aleksandrovna Naryshkina (1785–1855 ). He fought in the wars with France in 1807, in Austria in 1809 and in Turkey from 1810 to 1811. He commanded 9th Infantry Division, stationed in the Ukraine, from 1807 onwards. He was killed while crossing the Râmnicul Sărat River on 13 April 1811, though the story stating that he was drowned trying to save his coachman originated with his biographer E. Fuks and is not supported by his memoirs and documentary sources. It is however, supported by Aleksey Yermolov's memoirs, as well as by the military historian Christopher Duffy. He is buried at the New Jerusalem Monastery. He had two daughters - Mary and Barbara - and two sons - Alexander and Constantine.

References

1784 births
1811 deaths
Commanders of the Napoleonic Wars from the Russian Empire
Counts of the Russian Empire
Arkadi
Imperial Russian Army generals
People from the Russian Empire of Swedish descent
19th-century military personnel from the Russian Empire
18th-century military personnel from the Russian Empire
Princes from the Russian Empire